Dr. Howard T. Bellin is an American plastic surgeon, the director of CosMedica, a plastic surgery center in New York.

Education
Bellin obtained his bachelor's degree from Amherst College in 1957, and his M.D. from  New York Medical College in 1962, followed by an internship at   the University of California Hospital.

Family
Howard Bellin was born to Maurice Bellin and Etta Bellin. His family lived in Passaic Clifton and then South Orange, New Jersey.  In 1964 he married Christina Paolozzi, a model,   daughter of Alicia Spaulding and Count Lorenzo Paolozzi. The couple were known for their extravagant parties attended by a variety of glamorous personalities. The Bellins divorced in 1982. He has three children, Cheryl Blanchard, Marco Bellin and the director and screenwriter Andy Bellin.

Career
Bellin began his general surgery residency at the Metropolitan Hospital in New York for three years. In 1966 he joined the United States Air Force Medical Corp, stationed at Homestead Air Force Base, Florida.  He returned to New York in 1968 to complete  his plastic surgery residency at Columbia Presbyterian Medical Center. In the following years he was an instructor at Columbia College of Physicians and Surgeons and New York Medical College. He then started his own practice, Cosmedica in New York.

Publications
Bellin co-authored. "Bellin's Beautiful You Book" published in 1980 by Prentice-Hall that describes various plastic surgery procedures.  According to WorldCat, the book is held in 57 libraries   His second book, "BeautyScience" was published by Metropublish Ltd in 2000 and provides advice on cosmetic surgery. It has no copies listed in WorldCat.

Inventions
Bellin holds 8 American patents in his name, as well as a few in Germany. His first patent was a Portable EKG monitoring device, accredited to himself, Donald Fellner and Nichan Tchorbajian.

List of Inventions

Memberships
 American Society of Plastic Surgeons
 International Congress of Plastic and Reconstructive Surgeons
 New York Academy of Medicine (Fellow) 
 New York County Medical Society
 American Academy of Physician Inventors
 Institute of Ecosystem Studies (Scientific Advisory Committee)

Media
Bellin has been featured on many national television programs, including Oprah, Geraldo, Extra, CNN, MTV and 20/20. He has provided expert commentary for a variety of publications including the New York Times, in which he offers his medical expertise and experience in the cosmetic surgery practice.

He also appeared on the reality television series The Real Housewives of New York City, where he provided liposuction for Sonja Morgan.

References

Year of birth missing (living people)
Living people
Amherst College alumni
New York Medical College alumni
American plastic surgeons